Giovan Pietro Apollinare Offredi was a 15th-century Italian philosopher.

Works

References 

15th-century births
15th-century deaths
15th-century Italian philosophers